Lee Mark Grant (born 31 December 1985) is an English former footballer who played as a defender. He played for York City, Aston Villa and Southport.

Career
Born in York, North Yorkshire, Grant started his career with hometown club York City as an apprentice and made his first team debut after coming on as an 88th minute substitute in a 3–0 victory over Bristol Rovers. At the age of 16 years and 116 days, this appearance made him the second youngest player to feature for York. He was expected to start a three-year scholarship before joining FA Premier League team Aston Villa in July 2002, despite suggestions of him leaving York being refuted by assistant manager Adie Shaw.

He rejoined York on a month's loan in November 2004 and made his debut in a 1–0 defeat to Woking in the Conference National on 20 November. He opened the scoring in a 3–1 victory over Crawley Town on 18 December with a header on 40 minutes, which was followed with York's only goal in a 5–1 defeat at Scarborough. He finished his spell at the club with nine appearances. He was released from his Villa contract in 2005. Grant joined Conference side Southport in January 2006, but after only being able to make an appearance in the County Cup, he was released in February.

He now works in a tile shop in York (dunnington).

References

External links

1985 births
Association football defenders
Association football midfielders
Aston Villa F.C. players
English footballers
National League (English football) players
Living people
Footballers from York
Southport F.C. players
English Football League players
York City F.C. players